The Goidelic substrate hypothesis refers to the hypothesized language or languages spoken in Ireland before the Iron Age arrival of the Goidelic languages.

Hypothesis of non-Indo-European languages

Ireland was settled, like the rest of northern Europe, after the retreat of the ice sheets c. 10,500 BC. Indo-European languages are usually thought to have been a much later arrival. Some scholars suggest that the Goidelic languages may have been brought by the Bell Beaker culture circa 2500 BC, in contrast to the generally accepted theory that it was brought by the advent of the Iron Age. In contrast, other scholars argue for a much later date of arrival of Goidelic languages to Ireland based on linguistic evidence. Peter Schrijver has suggested that Irish was perhaps preceded by an earlier wave of Celtic speaking colonists (based on population names attested in Ptolemy's Geography) who were displaced by a later wave of proto-Irish speakers only in the 1st century AD, following a migration in the wake of the Roman conquest of Britain, with Irish and British Celtic languages only branching off from a common Insular Celtic language around that time.

Scholars have suggested:
 that an older language or languages could have been replaced by the Insular Celtic languages; and
 that words and grammatical constructs from the original language, or languages, may nevertheless persist as a substrate in the Celtic languages, especially in placenames and personal names.

Suggested non-Indo-European words in Irish
Gearóid Mac Eoin proposes the following words as deriving from the substrate: bréife 'ring, loop', cufar, cuifre/cuipre 'kindness', fafall/fubhal, lufe 'feminine', slife, strophais 'straw'; and the following placenames: Bréifne, Crufait, Dún Gaifi, Faffand, Grafand, Grafrenn, Life/Mag Liphi, Máfat.

Peter Schrijver submits the following words as deriving from the substrate: partán 'crab', Partraige (ethnonym), (note that partaing "crimson (Parthian) red" is a loanword from Lat. parthicus), pattu 'hare', petta 'pet, lap-dog', pell 'horse', pít 'portion of food', pluc '(round) mass', prapp 'rapid', gliomach 'lobster', faochán 'periwinkle', ciotóg 'left hand', bradán 'salmon', scadán 'herring'. In a further study he gives counter-arguments against some criticisms by Graham Isaac.

Ranko Matasović lists lacha ("duck"), sinnach ("fox"), luis ("rowan"), lon ("blackbird"), dega ("beetle"), ness ("stoat"). He also points out that there are words of possibly or probably non-Indo-European origin in other Celtic languages as well; therefore, the substrate may not have been in contact with Primitive Irish but rather with Proto-Celtic. Examples of words found in more than one branch of Celtic but with no obvious cognates outside Celtic include:
Middle Irish  'young woman', Middle Welsh  'heifer', perhaps Gaulish anderon (possibly connected with Basque  'lady, woman')
Old Irish  'short', Middle Welsh  'short', Gaulish Birrus (name); possibly related to the birrus, a short cloak or hood
Old Irish  'raven', Middle Welsh  'raven', Gaulish Brano-, sometimes translated as 'crow' (name element, such as Bran Ardchenn, Bran Becc mac Murchado, and Bran the Blessed)
Middle Irish  'badger', Middle Welsh  'badger', Gaulish Broco- (name element) (borrowed into English as brock)
Old Irish  '(war) chariot', Welsh , Gaulish carpento-, Carbanto-
Old Irish  'salmon', Middle Welsh  'salmon', Gaulish *esoks (borrowed into Latin as ); has been compared with Basque izokin

The Old Irish word for "horn", adarc, is also listed as a potential Basque loanword; in Basque the word is adar.

Gerry Smyth, in Space and the Irish Cultural Imagination, suggested that Dothar, the Old Irish name for the River Dodder, could be a substrate word.

See also
Pre-Celtic
Pre-Greek substrate
Pre-Indo-European languages
Prehistoric Ireland
Mythological Cycle
Germanic substrate hypothesis
Atlantic (Semitic) languages

References

Languages of Ireland
Prehistoric Ireland
Indo-European linguistics
Celtic studies
Pre-Indo-Europeans
Linguistic strata